Ian McColl CBE (22 February 1915 – 21 June 2005), was a Scottish journalist, editor and Liberal Party politician.

Background
He was the eldest son of John McColl and Sarah Isabella (aka Morag) McPherson, of Glasgow and Bunessan, Isle of Mull. He was educated at Hillhead High School, Glasgow. He married, in 1968, Brenda McKean. They had one daughter. He served during the war, with the Royal Air Force, 1940–46 (despatches, 1945). He was with Air Crew, Coastal Command 202 Squadron.

Political career
In 1931 he joined the Liberal Party at the age of 16. In 1933 he was elected to the executive of the Scottish Liberal Federation. In 1938 he became Honorary Secretary of the Scottish Liberal Federation. McColl twice stood as a Liberal party candidate for the United Kingdom Parliament; in the 1945 General Election at Dumfriesshire finishing third 

and at the 1950 General Election at Greenock coming second.

Media career
He joined the Scottish Daily Express as a cub reporter in 1933. He was Editor of the Scottish Daily Express from 1961–71. He was Editor of the Daily Express from 1971–74. He was a Director of Express Newspapers Ltd, from 1971–82. He was Chairman of Scottish Express Newspapers Ltd, from 1975–82. He was a Member of the Press Council from 1975–78. He was a Vice-President of the Newspaper Press Fund from 1981–2005. He was Chairman of the Media Division for the 1986 Commonwealth Games, Scotland from 1983–86. He was honoured with the Bank of Scotland, Scottish Press Life Achievement Award, in 1993.

He was appointed a Commander of the Most Excellent Order of the British Empire in 1983.

External links

References

Daily Express people
British male journalists
Commanders of the Order of the British Empire
Scottish Liberal Party parliamentary candidates
1915 births
2005 deaths